Pink sheet or Pink Sheets may refer to:

 "Pink sheet trading" (or "over-the-counter trading") directly between two parties, rather than through a broker
 Pink Sheets LLC, a private company that offers real-time quotation service for the stocks listed in the over-the-counter market
 Flyers handed out in the 1950 California Senate election campaign
 Results from individual polling stations in the 2012 Ghanaian general election

See also 
 Pink slip (disambiguation)